Central Kerema Rural LLG is a local-level government (LLG) of Gulf Province, Papua New Guinea.

Wards
01. Uaripi (Tairuma language speakers)
02. Mei'i
03. Lapari
04. Mirakere
05. Didimaua
06. Uriri (Kaki Ae language speakers)
07. Silo
08. Uamai No. 1
09. Uamai No. 2
10. Karama
11. Pukari
12. Koaru
13. Meporo
14. Mamavu

References

Local-level governments of Gulf Province